The Epic of Everest is a 1924 documentary about the Mallory and Irvine Mount Everest expedition. After a digital restoration in 2013, the film was re-released in UK cinemas. The publicity surrounding the film provoked a diplomatic incident, the "Affair of the Dancing Lamas", that delayed future expeditions and may have destabilised the Tibetan government.

"Captain John Noel was the official photographer on the 1924 British Expedition to Mount Everest, famed for the tragic loss of mountaineers, George Mallory and Andrew Irvine. Noel was an adventurous explorer who had tried but failed to get to Everest through Tibet in 1913. It is this centenary that the BFI is celebrating with the restoration of his film, which Noel financed himself and released as The Epic of Everest in 1924. He toured extensively around the world, lecturing with the film footage and beautiful colour slides."

In 2020, the restored print was selected by the BFI London Film Festival for inclusion in We Are One: A Global Film Festival, an online film festival organized during the COVID-19 pandemic.

See also
List of media related to Mount Everest

References

External links
 
 

1924 films
1924 documentary films
Black-and-white documentary films
Films about Mount Everest
Documentary films about climbing
British black-and-white films
British silent feature films
British sports documentary films
1920s British films
Silent adventure films